John Sachs (born 3 May 1957) is a British television presenter, voiceover and commentator. He narrated the original series of Gladiators, and was a longtime DJ on London's radio station Capital London. 

Sachs spent 12 years on Capital FM, where he won Variety Club ILR Presenter of the Year and Silver at the World Radio awards in New York. He has also worked at Jazz FM, BBC Radio 2, and Y100 in Florida, United States. His television credits include Gladiators, 4 Square, Take Your Pick!, The Brian Conley Show and Dancing on Ice. 

He has worked on a variety of television and radio adverts. He was also a presenter on Swansea Sound in Swansea, Wales. Sachs founded Talking Heads Productions in 1993, making television and radio commercials. He has been the voice of Disney Videos UK – voicing most of the previews from the company until the early 2000s, along with HIT Entertainment from 1997 to early 2000. Sachs became an executive producer of the television production company Eclipse Films in early 2011.

Along with his brother William, John is the adopted son of Fawlty Towers actor Andrew Sachs. He also has a half-sister Kate.

In 2020, he became the voiceover for Alan Carr's Epic Gameshow on ITV.

References

External links

John Sachs Official Website

BBC Radio 2 presenters
British male voice actors
British television executives
British radio presenters
British television presenters
British talent agents
1957 births
Living people
British radio executives
Gladiators (1992 British TV series)